The California Historical Society (CHS) is the official historical society of California. It was founded in 1871, by a group of prominent Californian intellectuals at Santa Clara University. It was officially designated as the Californian state historical society in 1979. Its headquarters are in San Francisco, though it hosts exhibits and collections across California.

History

The California Historical Society was founded in June 1871 by a group of prominent Californian politicians and professors at the Santa Clara University (then the College of Santa Clara), led by Californian Assemblyman John W. Dwinelle (an influential founder of the University of California). The stated mission of the society was “collecting and bringing to light and publishing, from time to time, all information not generally accessible on the subject of the early colonization and settlement of the west coast of America, and especially Northwestern Mexico, California, and Oregon. The society published 32 papers until 1901. From 1901 to 1906, the CHS temporarily merged with the California Genealogical Society. Following the devastation of the 1906 San Francisco earthquake, the society fell into dormancy until 1922. 

In 1922, the society was permanently reestablished by Templeton Crocker, famed expeditionary of the California Academy of Sciences.  In 1979 the organization was named the official state historical society, in a bill signed by Governor Jerry Brown. 

The Society maintains a collection of historical documents, photographs, art and other research materials, awards the annual California Historical Society Book Prize, and publishes California History, an academic journal, in association with the University of California Press. It occasionally hosts C-SPAN lectures on California history. Exhibitions have included a 2015 celebration at the Palace of Fine Arts of the centenary of the Panama–Pacific International Exposition, and the Society sponsored the 50th anniversary celebration of the Summer of Love in 2017. It hosts educational events as well as exhibitions at its San Francisco headquarters. After offering that building for sale to reduce costs, it plans to house its research library and store its collection in dispersed locations and organize touring exhibitions that will appear at venues including local historical societies throughout the state. However, it remained in that location, with a new exhibition, as of January 2021.

The Society hired Alicia Goehring as executive director and CEO in September 2019, after Anthea Hartig became director of the National Museum of American History.

Following Goehring's death in August 2022, the Society named COO Jen Whitley as interim CEO.

Locations
Shortly after its most recent refounding in 1922, the Society leased Room 508 of the Wells Fargo Building (at Second and Mission) as its headquarters. Subsequently, the Society moved its offices to 456 McAllister (sharing the Pioneer Hall building near City Hall with the Society of California Pioneers) in 1938 and the Flood Building as a temporary home in 1955 when the Pioneer society was expanding.

The society bought the Whittier Mansion in Pacific Heights as its headquarters in 1956, subsequently adding an adjacent building. In 1993 it sold both and bought the San Francisco Builders Exchange Building, which had housed E. M. Hundley Hardware and served as headquarters for Nancy Pelosi's first campaign for Congress; the building was gutted and rehabilitated, and the Society moved in 1995. In 2012, when the Golden Gate Bridge was 75 years old, the Society had its facade painted international orange, the color of the bridge. 

For several years the Society studied the feasibility of moving to the Old San Francisco Mint building, which would be renovated to house a museum and a community center.

In July 2020 the Society announced that it was planning to sell its headquarters building, however,  the Society remains in the Builders Exchange Building.

Collections 

The California Historical Society Collection represents the environmental, economic, social, political, and cultural heritage of the state of California, including materials from outside California that contribute to a greater understanding of the state and its people. The collection includes 50,000 volumes of books and pamphlets; 4,000 manuscript collections; 500,000 photographs; printed ephemera, periodicals, posters, broadsides, maps, and newspapers; the Kemble Collection on Western Printing and Publishing; 5,000 works of art, including paintings, drawings, and lithographs; and numerous artifacts and costumes.

Fine Art Collection 
The Historical Society houses an outstanding collection of over 5,000 works of art, including paintings, drawings, and lithographs. Artists represented in the Fine Art Collection include Albert Bierstadt, Maynard Dixon, George Albert Frost, William Hahn, Thomas Hill, Grace Carpenter Hudson, William Keith, Arthur Frank Mathews, and Theodore Wores.

Manuscripts Collection 

The Historical Society holds the papers of noteworthy organizations and businesses, including those of the American Civil Liberties Union of Northern California, League of Women Voters, California Tomorrow, Stern Grove Festival Association, Peoples Temple, and the Heller Ehrman law firm. The Society also holds the papers of influential persons, including the Burr-Allyne Family, San Francisco Mayor James Rolph, Jr, Asbury Harpending, and Isaias W. Hellman.

Ephemera Collection 

The ephemera collection consists of a wide range of ephemera pertaining to the state of California and each of its constituent counties. 

Dating from 1841 the collection includes ephemera created by or related to churches; civic associations and activist groups; clubs and societies, especially fraternal organizations; labor unions; auditoriums and theaters; historic buildings, landmarks, and museums; hotels and resorts; festivals and fairs; sporting events; hospitals, sanatoriums, prisons, and orphanages; schools, colleges, and universities; government agencies; elections, ballot measures, and political parties; infrastructure and transit systems; geographic features; and other subjects.

In 1964, former Society president, printing historian, and collector George L. Harding founded the Kemble Collection on Western Printing and Publishing, named in honor of pioneer California printer and publisher Edward Cleveland Kemble. Dedicated to the history of printing and publishing in the West, this collection began with three major gifts—Harding's printing and publishing library, William E. Loy's typographical library, and the business archives of San Francisco printing firm Taylor & Taylor—and has since grown in size and scope.

Photography Collection 
The Historical Society holds documentary and fine art photographs by photographers such as Marliese Gabrielson, Arnold Genthe, Louis Herman Heller, Eadweard Muybridge, Anton Wagner, Carleton Watkins, Minor White and Willard Worden.

See also
Historical societies
History of California
List of museums in San Francisco

References

External links

Official website
California Historical Society Digital Library
California Historical Society Collections at the Online Archive of California
California Historical Society Collection at Calisphere

State historical societies of the United States
 
Historiography of California
Museums in San Francisco
Museums established in 1871
Historical society museums in California
Libraries in San Francisco
1871 establishments in California
Clubs and societies in California
Financial District, San Francisco
Special collections libraries in the United States